L’Orchestre Symphonique National du Liban (The Lebanese National Symphony Orchestra) was founded in late 1999 in Beirut under the guidance of Dr. Walid Gholmieh and the management of the Conservatoire Libanais (Lebanese National Higher Conservatory of Music). In a few years, the Orchestra has proven itself both locally and regionally and gained great success. It gives 25 to 30 concerts per season at the church of the Saint Joseph University in Beirut and in other cities, playing a varied international repertoire by world-renowned classical music composers.

The Orchestra played host to well-known soloists such as the Polish guitarist Vladimir Gromolak, Dutch violinist Werther Vosn, tenor Plácido Domingo, composer and soprano Hiba Al Kawas, Spanish guitarist José María Gallardo Del Rey, Lebanese violinist Zareh Tcheroyan, the Polish pianist Radivonovitch and the Japanese pianist Atsuko Seta.

The Orchestra has accompanied the Prague Chamber Choir in Rossini's Stabat Mater.

The Orchestra has participated in the programs of the Al Bustan Winter Festival in Beit Mery and the Baalbeck International Festival.

They were also featured on an unreleased track by the band Gorillaz named "Whirlwind", from their third studio album Plastic Beach, but which was cut from it before its release. The Syrian National Orchestra for Arabic Music was also featured on the album, on the song "White Flag".

References

Lebanese orchestras
National orchestras
Musical groups established in 1999
1999 establishments in Lebanon